Jeremy Keith is an Irish web developer, writer, speaker, and musician. He authors a popular blog, and has written several books including DOM Scripting, a guide to web design with JavaScript and the Document Object Model. He curated the dConstruct conference, and co-founded Clearleft in 2005 with Andy Budd and Richard Rutter.

Books and articles

DOM Scripting
Keith's book DOM Scripting is a guide to enhancements to web pages using JavaScript and web standards. It assumes some preexisting knowledge of CSS. The first edition was published in 2005. Chapter 5 is available online as well as in print.

Bulletproof AJAX
Keith's book Bulletproof AJAX is a “step-by-step guide to enhancing Web sites with Ajax”. It assumes some preexisting knowledge of JavaScript. The first edition was published in February 2007. The introduction is available online as well as in print.

HTML5 for Web Designers
Keith's book HTML5 for Web Designers is a guide for introducing web designers to HTML5. The first edition was published in 2010. The book is available online as well as in print.

Resilient Web Design 

Keith's book Resilient Web Design is a book about web design. The first edition was published in 2016, the book is only available online, it's a web book.

Going Offline 
Keith's book Going Offline is a guide to service workers. It was published on 24 April 2018 by A Book Apart.

Public Speaking 
Jeremy Keith gave opening or closing keynotes at web design and web development conferences, and is a frequent speaker at design and interaction conferences, most notably An Event Apart.

Open source work 
Jeremy Keith has contributed to a number of open source projects using GitHub:

Other work 
 HuffDuffer creator
 Open Device Lab founder
 Science Hack Day first organizer
 Matter (magazine) initial release designer
 AMP Advisory Committee 2020-2021
 Homebrew Website Club Brighton organizer
 Codebar Brighton coach

Salter Cane 
Keith plays bouzouki in the Brighton rock band Salter Cane.

References

External links
 
 
 
 2011-05-17 Jeremy Keith on the Design Principles of HTML5

English bloggers
Living people
Place of birth missing (living people)
Year of birth missing (living people)
Irish bloggers
Web developers
English male writers
Irish technology writers
21st-century English writers
English male musicians
21st-century English musicians
21st-century Irish male musicians